Frank Fahey may refer to:
 Frank Fahey (politician) (born 1951), Irish property developer and former politician
 Frank Fahey (baseball) (1896–1954), American Major League baseball player

See also
 Francis Fahy